Ignacio 'Nacho' Conte Crespo (born 21 February 1969 in Zaragoza, Aragon) is a Spanish former footballer who played as a midfielder.

Conte began playing football in the Real Betis youth system. He played for the club's B side, however local rivals Sevilla FC recruited Conte for their B team after Betis B was relegated in 1989. Soon after joining Sevilla, Conte was promoted to the club's first team where he would make his La Liga debut under manager Vicente Cantatore. Conte scored his first goal three days after his Liga debut in a Copa del Rey match against RCD Espanyol. Although the 1989–90 La Liga was Conte's first season in the top division of Spanish football, he was a key performer as Sevilla qualified for the UEFA Cup, and he earned call-ups to Spain's under-21 and full national teams.

After the 1992–93 season, Conte signed for CD Tenerife.

References

External links

1969 births
Living people
Footballers from Zaragoza
Spanish footballers
Association football midfielders
La Liga players
Segunda División players
Segunda División B players
Tercera División players
Betis Deportivo Balompié footballers
Sevilla FC players
CD Tenerife players
Racing de Santander players
Hércules CF players
Spain youth international footballers
Spain under-21 international footballers
Spain international footballers